Adelphotectonica reevei is a species of sea snail, a marine gastropod mollusk in the family Architectonicidae, known as the staircase shells or sundials.

References 

 Powell A. W. B., New Zealand Mollusca, William Collins Publishers Ltd, Auckland, New Zealand 1979 
 Photo
 Bieler R. (1993). Architectonicidae of the Indo-Pacific (Mollusca, Gastropoda). Abhandlungen des Naturwissenschaftlichen Vereins in Hamburg (NF) 30: 1-376 [15 December]. page(s): 99
 Spencer H.G., Willan R.C., Marshall B.A. & Murray T.J. (2011) Checklist of the Recent Mollusca Recorded from the New Zealand Exclusive Economic Zone.

Architectonicidae
Gastropods of Australia
Gastropods of New Zealand
Gastropods described in 1862
Taxa named by Sylvanus Charles Thorp Hanley